To be thirsty is to experience thirst, a craving for potable fluids.

Thirsty may also refer to:

Thirsty (novel), a 1997 horror novel by Matthew T. Anderson
Thirsty (album), a 2007 album by Marvin Sapp
"Thirsty" (song), a 2014 song by Mariah Carey
"Thirsty", a 2015 song by AJR from Living Room
"Thirsty", a 1960s song by the Camelots
"Thirsty", a 2015 song by Daya from Daya
"Thirsty", a 2014 song by PartyNextDoor from PartyNextDoor Two
"Thirsty", a 2017 song by Taemin from Move

See also

 Thirst (disambiguation)